Geodia arabica is a species of sponge in the family Geodiidae. It is found in the waters of the Arabian Sea and of the Red Sea. The species was first described by Henry John Carter in 1869.

References

Bibliography 
 Carter, H.J. (1869). A descriptive account of four subspherous sponges, Arabian and British, with general observations. Annals and Magazine of Natural History. (4) 4: 1-28, pls I-II.

Tetractinellida
Animals described in 1869
Taxa named by Henry John Carter